Pine Township, Indiana may refer to one of the following places:

 Pine Township, Benton County, Indiana
 Pine Township, Porter County, Indiana
 Pine Township, Warren County, Indiana

See also 

Pine Township (disambiguation)

Indiana township disambiguation pages